Sanxing Township, also spelled Sanshing Township, is a rural township in the western part of Yilan County, Taiwan.

Geography
It has an area of 144.22 km2 and estimate population of 21,258 people as of February 2023.

Administrative divisions
The township comprises 18 villages: Dayi, Dayin, Dazhou, Gongzhao, Guilin, Hangjian, Jiqing, Renhe, Shangwu, Shuangxian, Tianfu, Tianshan, Wande, Wanfu, Weiqian, Yide, Yuanshan and Yuemei.

Education
 St. Mary's Medicine Nursing and Management College

Tourist attractions
 Changpi Lake
 Spring Onion Culture Museum
Sanxing Ganquan Temple
 Yuzun Temple

Transportation
Highway 7
County Road 196

Notable natives
 Chen Chu, Mayor of Kaohsiung City (2006–2018)
 John Deng, Minister of Economic Affairs (2014-2016)

References

External links

  

Townships in Yilan County, Taiwan